Ethmia macneilli is a moth in the family Depressariidae. It is found in the United States in California and Arizona.

The ground color of the forewings is white with scattered dark scales tending to form lines between the veins in the distal half. The ground color of the hindwings is white, becoming pale brownish toward the margins.

References

Moths described in 1973
macneilli